Peter Rainer Zakarias Viitanen (born 21 February 1980, in Stockholm) is a Swedish actor. He is best known for his role as Kenneth Gärdestad in the film Ted: För kärlekens skull. Viitanen is a second-generation Sweden Finn and speaks Finnish with his family.

Filmography
1993 – Kådisbellan
1994 – Sixten
1995 – Majken (TV-series)
1996 – Kloak (TV-series)
1996 – Pin up
1996 – Skuggornas hus (TV-series)
1998 – Längtans blåa blomma (TV-series)
1998 – Pip-Larssons (TV-series)
2000 – En klass för sig (TV-series)
2000 – Judith (TV-series)
2000 – Hotel Seger (TV-series)
2002 – Skattkammarplaneten
2002 – Skeppsholmen (TV-series)
2004 – Fröken Sverige
2004 – Lokalreportern (TV-series)
2004 – Orka! Orka! (TV-series)
2005 – Kocken
2005 – Vinnare och förlorare
2005 – Kim Novak badade aldrig i Genesarets sjö
2005 – Lovisa och Carl Michael (TV-series)
2006 – Tusenbröder – Återkomsten
2006 – Mästerverket (TV-series)
2007 – Leende guldbruna ögon (TV-series)
2008 – Oskyldigt dömd (TV-series)
2009 – 183 dagar (TV-series)
2009 – Wallander – Skytten
2010 – Bröderna Jaukka
2012–2014 – Äkta människor (TV-series)
2013 – Mördaren ljuger inte ensam
2015 – Tjuvheder
2015 – Vitt skräp
2018 – Ted: För kärlekens skull
2018 – Sthlm Rekviem (TV-series)
2019 – Vår tid är nu (TV-series)
2019 – Miniräknarna (TV-series)
2020 – Lassemajas Detektivbyrå - Tågrånarens Hemlighet
2020 – Den längsta dagen
2021 – Vitt skräp
2021 – The Unlikely Murderer (TV-series)
2022 – Clark (TV-series)
2022 – Försvunna människor (TV-series)
2022 – Atonement
2023 – Top Dog (TV-series)
2023 – Ronja Rövardotter (TV-series)

References

Living people
1980 births
21st-century Swedish actors
Male actors from Stockholm
Swedish people of Finnish descent